Kenneth, Ken or Kenny Baker may refer to:

 Kenneth F. Baker (1908–1996), American professor of plant diseases
 Kenny Baker (American performer) (1912–1985), American radio singer and actor
 Kenny Baker (trumpeter) (1921–1999), British jazz trumpeter
 Kenny Baker (fiddler) (1926–2011), American bluegrass fiddler with Bill Monroe
 Kenneth Baker (Jesuit) (born 1929), American Roman Catholic priest
 Kenny Baker (English actor) (1934–2016), played R2-D2 in Star Wars
 Ken Baker (trade unionist) (died 2002), British trade unionist
 Kenneth Baker, Baron Baker of Dorking (born 1934), British Conservative politician
 Ken Baker (footballer) (born 1944), Australian rules footballer
 Ken Baker (entertainment journalist) (born 1970), American TV entertainment journalist
 Kenneth Baker (Metal Gear), fictional character
 Ken Baker, member of Unicorn (English band)

See also
 Ken Barker, Australian Roman Catholic priest